Walid Al Sbaay is a Libyan footballer who plays as a centre back for Al-Ahly Tripoli.

References

External links
 
 

1983 births
Living people
Libyan footballers
Libya international footballers
Association football defenders
Al-Ahli SC (Tripoli) players
Libyan Premier League players